Cenaspis aenigma is a species of colubrid snake in the subfamily Dipsadinae and the only member of the monotypic genus Cenaspis. It is endemic to the highlands of western Chiapas, Mexico, where it was described from a single, partially digested male specimen found in the stomach of a Central American coral snake (Micrurus nigrocinctus). This is referenced in its generic name, as cena is Spanish for "dinner". Despite being partially digested, the specimen still displayed many unique traits, including undivided subcaudals for the full length of the tail, as well as a simple hemipenis completely covered in calyces with a largely non-bifurcated sulcus spermaticus. These traits are not known from any other colubroid snake in the Western Hemisphere.

Description
Dorsally, C. aenigma is uniformly pale brown. Ventrally, it is whitish with three dark stripes running the length of the belly on the ventrals, and one dark stripe running the length of the tail in the center of the subcaudals.

References

Further reading
Campbell, Jonathan A.; Smith, Eric N.; Hall, Alexander S. (2018). "Caudals and Calyces: The Curious Case of the Consumed Chiapan Colubroid". Journal of Herpetology 52 (4): 458-471. (Cenaspis, new genus; C. aenigma, new species). (in English, with an abstract in Spanish).

Dipsadinae
Monotypic snake genera
Endemic reptiles of Mexico
Reptiles described in 2018